1,1-Diiodoethane is an organic saturated haloalkane containing iodine with formula CHCHI.

Preparation

1,1-Diiodoethane can be synthesized from gem-dihaloalkanes. The starting material is 1,1-dichloroethane, and iodoethane is a source of iodine. In the presence of aluminium trichloride, 1,1-dichloroethane will converted to 1,1-diiodoethane.

To be specific, mix 0.4 mol (~39.6 g) of 1,1-dichloroethane with 1.2 mol (~187 g) of ethyl iodide, and ~2.0 g of aluminum chloride. Heat for three hours using steam bath. Then, wash the mixture with HO and NaHSO respectively, and dry with MgSO. By boiling at 76-76 °C and 25 mmHg, about 67.3 g of product will be received when distilled.

The alternative method, which does not require 1,1-dichloroethane, is the reaction of iodine, triethylamine and hydrazone of acetaldehyde. Using 1 mol of acetaldehyde, about 95 g, which is 34% from acetaldehyde, of 1,1-diiodoethane formed.

Application

1,1-Diiodoethane is commonly used as a reactant in reaction such as SN2. The following are some examples of SN2 reaction using 1,1-diiodoethane as a reactant.

Moreover, is can also be used as a reactant in enolate substitution reaction as the following examples.

See also
1,2-Diiodoethylene
1,2-Difluoroethane
1,2-Diiodoethane
1,1-Dibromoethane
1,2-Difluoroethylene

References

External links
 PubChem Compound Summary for CID 68980
 Chemistry of Ethylidene Moieties on Platinum Surfaces:  1,1-Diiodoethane on Pt(111)

Iodoalkanes